The ivory-billed aracari or ivory-billed araçari (Pteroglossus azara) is a near-passerine bird in the toucan family Ramphastidae. It is found in Brazil, Colombia, Ecuador, Peru, and Venezuela.

Taxonomy and systematics

The ivory-billed aracari was originally classified in genus Ramphastos. The International Ornithological Committee (IOC) recognizes two subspecies: P. a. flavirostris (Fraser, 1841) and the nominate P. a. azara (Vieillot, 1819). The South American Classification Committee of the American Ornithological Society, the Clements taxonomy, and BirdLife International's Handbook of the Birds of the World include a third, P. a. mariae (Gould, 1854), which the IOC treats as a separate species, the brown-mandibled aracari. The two subspecies recognized by the IOC have also at times been treated as species, but all three taxa interbreed where their ranges overlap.

The ivory-billed aracari's specific epithet commemorates the naturalist Félix de Azara.

This article follows the IOC two-subspecies model.

Description

The two subspecies (and the brown-mandibled species) do not differ appreciably in length, weight, or plumage but only in bill color. Adult males have a black cap above a chestnut head and throat, maroon-red nape and upper back, green lower back, and red rump. They have a narrow black band under the throat, a wide red band on the upper breast, a wide black band on the lower breast, a yellow belly, and green thighs. Adult females have a dark brown cap and a narrower black band below the throat than males.

The nominate subspecies' bill is mostly yellow, with a deep red to brown line on the maxilla that is broad at the base and tapers to a black tip. It has red, black, and ivory markings along its edge that resemble teeth. P. a. flavirostris bill has a yellow to ivory maxilla with an orange spot under the nostril, black and white "teeth", and a yellow to ivory mandible with a narrow orange-brown line down its middle.

Distribution and habitat

The nominate subspecies of ivory-billed aracari is found in the Brazilian state of Amazonas between the left bank of the Rio Solimões (upper Amazon) and the right bank of the Rio Negro. P. a. flavirostris is found in southeastern Colombia, southern Venezuela, eastern Ecuador, northeastern Peru, and northwestern Brazil with some overlap with the nominate. The species inhabits a variety of forest landscapes including varzea, gallery forest, and secondary forest, and to a lesser extent terra firme, bamboo, cloudforest, and plantations. It is more common in early- to mid-successional forest than mature.

Behavior

Movement

The ivory-billed aracari is believed to be a year-round resident throughout its range.

Feeding

The ivory-billed aracari forages in the forest's upper level and the canopy, typically in pairs or in a small group. There are few details known of its diet but it appears to be mostly fruit with some arthropods.

Breeding

The ivory-billed aracari's breeding season spans from December to May in most of its range but is from February to August in the western and southwestern parts of it. It is assumed to nest in tree cavities like other toucans. Its clutch size is two to four eggs. Nothing else is known about its breeding biology.

Vocalization

What is thought to be the ivory-billed aracari's song is "a series of 2–6 wailing 'twaaa-a-a' or 'tweee-ee' or 'traaa-at' notes". Other vocalizations include "rattles, grunt-like contact notes, nasal 'nyek', purr-like notes, 'kyeek' alarm, [and] pure rattles 'bddddt'".

Status

The IUCN follows HBW taxonomy and so does not separately assess the ivory-billed and brown-mandibled aracaris. Taken as a whole it has a very large range, and though its population size is not known it is believed to be stable. No immeditate threats have been identified. The "[v]aried habitats utilized and changing nature of its successional habitats suggest that [the] species is not likely to become threatened in near future.

References

ivory-billed aracari
Birds of the Amazon Basin
Birds of the Colombian Amazon
Birds of the Ecuadorian Amazon
Birds of the Peruvian Amazon
Birds of the Venezuelan Amazon
ivory-billed aracari
Taxa named by Louis Jean Pierre Vieillot
Taxonomy articles created by Polbot